SIGMO is a humanoid robot designed to demonstrate the applications of passive dynamics technologies.

SIGMO stands for Synthetic, IntelliGent, MObility, and was developed by a team of high school students to demonstrate the capabilities of passive-dynamic actuation techniques.

The technology used to enable SIGMO to walk is being applied to advanced prosthetic devices.  Current prosthetic devices are nearing the limitations of the available technologies and require advancements such as customized motion, lower cost, and the development of light-weight materials.

Existing humanoid robot systems such as ASIMO and QRIO use many motors to achieve locomotion.  These motors reduce efficiency and add unnecessary weight and cost to the robot.  SIGMO attempts to alleviate these symptoms by providing a system which uses no motors for locomotion, instead employing passive-dynamic technology.

Passive-dynamic systems cite low power consumption, high durability, and low cost.  The design is based on the skeletal structure of the human body, consisting of two legs with hip, knee, and ankle joints, each representing 1 degree of freedom (DOF).  Movement is accomplished with the aid of gravity (walking down a slope) or by minimal  actuation to enable the machine to walk on level ground.  SIGMO was developed using proven methods of gravity-driven passive dynamic bipeds.  Small actuators were added to the legs to provide walking capability on level ground.

This method of locomotion is very energy efficient because it uses no motors for walking.  The omission of motors also cites a drastic weight reduction, further enhancing the locomotive efficiency.  This also frees up room inside the torso for the circuitry that controls SIGMO's movements, unlike other robots that require a "backpack" like attachment.

SIGMO has an upper torso which mimics the movements of actual humans.  The arms are motorized with small servo motors which enable SIGMO to manipulate objects within its grasp.  The main chassis is fabricated of aluminum sheet metal, which has a high strength and light weight.  The knee sockets are fabricated out of steel and aluminum.  While the steel weighs more than the aluminum, this helps to transfer the weight load from the torso (contains heavy servo components) to the legs and feet which rest on the ground.

An updated model of SIGMO, currently in the research and development stage, will incorporate more precise control over limb movement and directional stability.  To add more functionality SIGMO will have more motors, but use each more efficiently than previous designs.  Knowledge of actuation techniques gained from previous experiments will be applied to reduce complexity and maintain an efficient method of locomotion.  A framework is in development to allow multiple configurations of the robot to lower production costs over time and increase flexibility of design during testing.  The robust internal skeleton will be modifiable to serve as a platform for future designs.  Intelligent maneuvering will also be tested with the new prototype to develop efficient algorithms and control models for both simple and complex environments.

External links 
 SIGMO Robotic Developments
 Cornell Research Lab

Bipedal humanoid robots
2005 robots
Robots of the United States